Papyrus 78 (in the Gregory-Aland numbering), designated by 𝔓78, is an early copy of the New Testament in Greek. It is a papyrus manuscript of the Epistle of Jude. The surviving texts of Jude are verses 4-5 & 7-8. 𝔓78 is written in an elegant hand. The manuscript has been paleographically assigned to the 3rd century (or 4th century).

Description 
 Text 
The Greek text of this codex is a representative of the Alexandrian text-type. 𝔓78 displays a free text. Aland placed it in Category I (because of its date).

 Present location 
It is currently housed at the Sackler Library (P. Oxy. 2684) in Oxford.

Textual variants 

 v5: Addition of αδελφοι (brothers) after βουλομαι (I plan).
 v7: υπεχουσαι (undergoing) becomes επεχουσαι (holding fast to).
 v8: ουτοι (these) becomes αυτοι (themselves).
 v8: δοξας (plural: glories) becomes δοξαν (singular: glory).

See also 

 List of New Testament papyri
 Oxyrhynchus Papyri

References

Further reading 

 L. Ingrams, P. Kingston, Peter Parsons, and John Rea, Oxyrhynchus Papyri, XXXIV (London: 1968), pp. 4–6. 
 M. Mees, P78: ein neuer Textzeuge für den Judasbrief, Orient Press I (Rome: 1970), pp. 5–10.

Images 
 P. Oxy. 2684 from Papyrology at Oxford's "POxy: Oxyrhynchus Online" 
 Papyrus 78 recto 
 Papyrus 78 verso

External links 

 Robert B. Waltz. NT Manuscripts: Papyri, Papyri 𝔓78.

New Testament papyri
3rd-century biblical manuscripts
Early Greek manuscripts of the New Testament
Epistle of Jude papyri